Jimmy McGill is the original name of Saul Goodman, a fictional character in the TV series Breaking Bad and Better Call Saul.

Jimmy McGill may also refer to:

Jimmy McGill (footballer, born 1939) (1939–2006), footballer with Oldham Athletic, Crewe Alexandra, Chester City and Wrexham
Jimmy McGill (footballer, born 1926) (1926–2013), Scottish footballer with Bury, Derby County, Kilmarnock, Berwick Rangers, Queen of the South and Cowdenbeath
Jimmy McGill (footballer, born 1946) (1946–2015), Scottish footballer with Arsenal, Huddersfield Town, Hull City and Halifax Town

See also
 James McGill (1744–1813), Scottish-Canadian businessman and founder of McGill University